Cesar Raúl Benavides (12 March 1912 – 25 March 2011) was a Chilean Army general and member of the Government Junta that ruled Chile from 1973–1990.  He served on the junta as a member from 1981–1985.

References

Chilean Army generals
1920 births
2011 deaths
20th-century Chilean military personnel